The 2010–11 season was Huddersfield Town's seventh consecutive season in the third tier of English football. After losing to Millwall in the play-offs in the previous season, many hoped that Huddersfield would gain promotion to the Football League Championship. After finishing in third place with a club record of 87 points, Huddersfield lost the play-off final at Old Trafford, by 3–0 against Peterborough United, meaning that they would stay in League One for another season.

Squad at the start of the season

Review
After the near miss in the play-offs, many think that Huddersfield Town would be one of the favourites for promotion that season. Just a week after the defeat to Millwall, manager Lee Clark made his first signing of the season, buying the Scotland U-21 midfielder Scott Arfield for an undisclosed fee from the recently relegated Scottish Premier League side Falkirk. On the same day, Clark released Dean Heffernan (who returned to Australia to honour his contract with Melbourne Heart), Robbie Williams (who later joined Stockport County), Lewis Nightingale, Taser Hassan and Phil Jevons (who joined Morecambe on a permanent basis on 3 July).

On 2 June, the Icelandic international Joey Guðjónsson signed a 2-year contract from the recently relegated Premier League side Burnley. Two days later, the Scottish international left-back Gary Naysmith signed for Huddersfield after rejecting a new contract at Sheffield United. On the same day, goalkeeper Simon Eastwood left the club to join the newly promoted Football League Two side Oxford United. On 17 June, the goalkeeper Ian Bennett was signed on a free transfer from Sheffield United. On 22 June, the striker Tom Denton left the club by mutual consent. On the following day, the defender Andy Butler also had his contract paid up and left the club. On 29 June, the left-back Joe Skarz signed for the Football League Two side Bury for an undisclosed fee. The next day, the winger Lee Croft joined Huddersfield on a 6-month loan deal from Derby County. He returned to Derby on 3 January 2011. On 1 July, the defender Jamie McCombe, whose brother John, played for Huddersfield in the not too distant past, joined the Huddersfield for an undisclosed fee from Bristol City. The following day, after failing to reach a new deal, Krystian Pearce left the club after playing for just 45 minutes. He eventually joined Notts County. On 6 July, the midfielder James Berrett left the club to join the League One side Carlisle United on a free transfer. Later that day, the midfielder Michael Collins joined Football League Championship side Scunthorpe United for an undisclosed fee. On 14 July, the young Irish winger Graham Carey signed on a 6-month loan from the Scottish Premier League runners-up Celtic. He returned to Celtic on 13 January 2011, after Huddersfield failed to agree terms on an extension to his deal. On 21 July, the striker Joe Garner signed on a 6-month loan from Nottingham Forest. He returned there on 4 January 2011. On 28 July, two of Huddersfield's youngsters, Jack Hunt and Leigh Franks, were sent out on 6-month loans to Chesterfield and Oxford United respectively. On 5 August, the midfielder Damien Johnson was signed on a season-long loan from the League One rivals Plymouth Argyle. The following day, the striker Robbie Simpson joined Brentford on a season-long loan. On 25 August, the striker Alan Lee joined the club for an undisclosed fee from Crystal Palace. On 31 August, Jim Goodwin left the club by mutual consent. He joined the Scottish Premier League side Hamilton Academical on 6 September. On 8 September, Theo Robinson joined the Championship side Millwall on an emergency 3-month loan deal, but he returned in November, after an injury. He rejoined the club on a permanent deal on 13 January, for an undisclosed fee. On 15 October, Huddersfield brought in the experienced goalkeeper Nick Colgan on a one-month loan from the Conference National side Grimsby Town. He returned a month later, after making no appearances. On 21 January 2011, he signed for Huddersfield on a permanent deal, after being released by Grimsby. On 1 January 2011, as the transfer window reopened, Huddersfield signed the experienced Ireland international Kevin Kilbane on loan from Hull City for the rest of the season. On 10 January, Huddersfield signed Newcastle United's Hungarian international defender Tamás Kádár on loan. On 27 January, the Huddersfield stalwart Nathan Clarke joined the League One rivals Colchester United on loan. On 31 January, as the transfer window was about to shut, Danny Cadamarteri returned to Huddersfield on a short-term contract following his release by the Scottish Premier League side Dundee United. On 26 February, Huddersfield signed the left-back Stephen Jordan on an emergency one-month loan from Sheffield United, following injuries to Gary Naysmith and Liam Ridehalgh. On 15 March, a week after the injury that curtailed Anthony Pilkington's involvement in the season, Huddersfield increased its attacking options by bringing in the winger Danny Ward on loan from the Premier League side Bolton Wanderers for the rest of the season. Defensive options were bolstered by signing the centre-back Sean Morrison on loan from Reading on 23 March. Just as the transfer window shut, the young midfielder Aidan Chippendale was sent on loan to the Conference National side York City

On 16 June, Huddersfield was drawn away to Carlisle United in the first round of the Carling Cup. The following day, the new fixtures were released, with Huddersfield's first league game being against the Football League Two champions Notts County on 7 August.

Squad at the end of the season

Transfers

In

Loans in

Out

Loans out

Final league table

Results

Pre-season

League One

Football League play-offs

FA Cup

Football League Cup

Football League Trophy

Appearances and goals

References

Huddersfield Town A.F.C. seasons
Huddersfield Town